François Châtelet (27 April 1925 – 26 December 1985) was a historian of philosophy, political philosophy and professor in the socratic tradition. He was the husband of philosopher Noëlle Châtelet, the sister of Lionel Jospin.

Biography
Châtelet was born and died in Paris.  Along with Michel Foucault and Gilles Deleuze, he is at the origin of the department of philosophy at the University of Vincennes, and co-founded the Collège international de philosophie (International College of Philosophy). In 1971 he was professor at the University of São Paulo. This was an act of protest that he made with Jean-Pierre Vernant against the Brazilian military government. Châtelet has always been concerned with linking thought and action, engaging in a restless combat with his contemporaries. 

His conception of philosophy makes him more of a historian of philosophy than a philosopher. In his work une histoire de la raison (A History of Reason), he shows the role of philosophy in the constitution of modern Western rationality. His work Platon (Plato) is a formidable invitation-initiation to the thought of the ancient Greek philosopher.

Works
 Périclès et son siècle (Pericles and his century) (1960)
 Platon (Plato) (1965)
 Hegel (Hegel) (1968)
 La philosophie des Professeurs (The Philosophy of Professors) (1970)
 Histoire de la philosophie (History of Philosophy) (1972–1973) — 8 volumes
 Une histoire de la raison (A History of Reason)

References

External links
 

1925 births
1985 deaths
Writers from Paris
French historians of philosophy
Academic staff of Paris 8 University Vincennes-Saint-Denis
Academic staff of the University of São Paulo
20th-century French historians
French male non-fiction writers
20th-century French philosophers
20th-century French male writers